James Hong (born February 22, 1929) is an American actor, producer, and director. He has worked in numerous productions in U.S. media since the 1950s, portraying a variety of roles. With more than 650 film and television credits as of 2022, he is one of the most prolific actors of all time.

Hong became known to audiences through starring in the detective series The New Adventures of Charlie Chan (1957–1958), and through frequent appearances on many television shows including the original Hawaii Five-O (1969–1974), Bonanza (1960), Perry Mason (1962–1963), The Man from U.N.C.L.E. (1965–1966), I Spy (1965–1967), and Kung Fu (1972–1975). He has appeared in numerous films, in both comedic and dramatic roles, including Kahn the butler in Chinatown (1974) and its sequel The Two Jakes (1990), Hannibal Chew in Blade Runner (1982), David Lo Pan in Big Trouble in Little China (1986), Jeff Wong in Wayne's World 2 (1993), Master Hong in Balls of Fury (2007), Jerry Chen in R.I.P.D. (2013) and Gong Gong in Everything Everywhere All at Once (2022).

As a voice actor, Hong voiced Chi-Fu in Mulan (1998), Daolon Wong on the animated television series Jackie Chan Adventures (2002–2004), Professor Chang in Teen Titans (2003–2006), Mr. Ping in the Kung Fu Panda media franchise, Zong Shi in Trollhunters: Rise of the Titans (2021) and Mr. Gao in Turning Red (2022), in addition to several video game roles including Sleeping Dogs and Call of Duty: Black Ops II (both 2012).

Earlier in his career, Hong co-founded East West Players, the first Asian American theatre organization and the longest continuously running minority theatre in the United States, to increase Asian American representation in the industry. On May 10, 2022, he received a star on the Hollywood Walk of Fame for his contributions to the American film and television industries.

Early life
Hong was born on February 22, 1929, in Minneapolis, Minnesota, to Chinese emigrant parents Ng Fok Hong (aka Frank W. Hong) and Lee Shui Fa. His father emigrated from Hong Kong to Chicago, Illinois, via Canada, and later moved to Minneapolis where he owned a restaurant and was leader of the local Hip Sing Tong. Hong's paternal grandfather was from Taishan.

For his early education, Hong moved to Hong Kong, where he lived in Kowloon, before returning to the United States at the age of 10. Growing up, Hong stated he was the only Asian student in a class of 500 children. As a result, he was the victim of bullying and racism by classmates who targeted him because he was seen as a foreigner and because he could not speak English well. He graduated from Minneapolis Central High School. He first developed an interest in performing arts after watching Peking opera performers rehearse at his father's shop.

Hong studied civil engineering at the University of Minnesota, where he concentrated the majority of his free time on moving plates and fixing templates for the drill squad.  However, his studies were soon interrupted as the Korean War began in early 1950s, and Hong was drafted into the United States Army. After the war, Hong moved to Los Angeles in 1953 with a friend, where he would finish his degree at the University of Southern California. Hong soon began working full time as a road engineer for Los Angeles County during the day, while acting in the evenings, the weekends, and during his vacation and sick days. He eventually quit engineering for good, after five and a half years, to devote himself to acting and voice work full-time.

Military service
Hong served in the United States Army at Fort McClellan and Camp Rucker in Alabama with the Special Services for 18 months from 1952 to 1953. After finishing his training for the day, he would entertain soldiers during the Korean War; upon witnessing Hong's performing prowess, the camp general asked Hong to stay at Camp Rucker and be in charge of the camp's live shows rather than deploy overseas.

Hong reflected on this experience and how it may have saved his life:

Career
Hong has played over 600 television and film roles. His career in show business began in the 1950s when he redubbed soundtracks of several Asian films. He dubbed the voices of characters Ogata (Akira Takarada) and Dr. Serizawa (Akihiko Hirata) in the 1956 film Godzilla, King of the Monsters!, as well as the title character in The Human Vapor.

In February 1954, Hong appeared on the radio and television game show You Bet Your Life with Groucho Marx. In this appearance, he did a number of impersonations including one of Groucho himself. Hong and his partner won $140 in the quiz. They contested the major prize of $2000 but did not win.

In 1956, Hong was cast as Jimmy Ling in the episode "Red Tentacles" of the Western aviation adventure series Sky King, starring Kirby Grant. He also guest-starred in the NBC Western series The Californians.

In 1957–1958, he was cast as the "Number One Son", Barry Chan, in the British-American series The New Adventures of Charlie Chan starring J. Carrol Naish as Charlie Chan. In an interview on CBS Sunday Morning, Hong revealed that Naish in a racist outburst had him fired from the series for missing only one line. Hong described Naish as a very prejudiced person and how Naish's actions were very hurtful to him. The role of the Number One Son was played by Keye Luke in the predecessor films. However, Keye Luke's character was known as Lee Chan.

In 1959, he appeared as a prince on an episode of Walt Disney's ABC series, Zorro. He was thereafter cast as Chung Lind in the 1960 episode "East of Danger" in the David Janssen NBC crime drama series Richard Diamond, Private Detective. From 1960 to 1962, he appeared four times on the ABC/Warner Brothers crime drama Hawaiian Eye, twice each on the ABC series Hong Kong and Adventures in Paradise, and once on ABC's related series, The Islanders.

In 1962, he appeared on CBS's Perry Mason as Dean Chang in "The Case of the Weary Watchdog". On September 23, 1963, Hong hit the prime time slot playing spy Wen Lee in, "The Hundred Days of the Dragon", the second episode of ABC's "The Outer Limits" first season. That year Hong also played Louis Kew in "The Case of the Floating Stones". He also appeared three times on the NBC military sitcom Ensign O'Toole. In 1964, he appeared in an episode of Kentucky Jones. In 1965, Hong was one of the original founding members of the East West Players, an early Asian American theatre organization. Also in 1966, he played the bar owner Mr. Shu in The Sand Pebbles. Hong also appeared in several episodes of the original Hawaii Five-O.

Hong had a small part on a 1972 episode of CBS's The Bob Newhart Show. He was a frequent guest star on the 1972–1975 ABC television series Kung Fu, joined the cast on the final season of CBS's Switch, as Wang, and also played a flight attendant in the original 1979 film In 1975 he played restaurant owner Mr. Wong on All in the Family; the episode was entitled, "Edith Breaks Out". He appeared as a doctor accused of performing an illegal abortion in the Blake Edwards movie The Carey Treatment in 1972. He was also in the 1979 film The In-Laws. He starred as a uniformed man in the 1980 comedy cult film Airplane! He has also directed such films as Teen Lust.

Hong played immortal ghost sorcerer Lo Pan in John Carpenter's cult classic Big Trouble in Little China (1986), eye manufacturer Chew in Blade Runner, Evelyn Mulwray's loyal and vigilant butler in Chinatown and The Two Jakes, and a low-rent private eye in Black Widow. He also appeared in the film The Vineyard (1989).

Hong's first appearance as a host in a Chinese restaurant was in the movie Flower Drum Song. Hong then appeared as a host in a Chinese restaurant in the 1975 All In the Family episode "Edith Breaks Out" as well as on the well-known Seinfeld episode "The Chinese Restaurant". Hong also played a similar role in several episodes of The Big Bang Theory during its first season, as well as in the "Color Blind" episode during the first season of Alias. Hong portrayed Chow Ting, a dry cleaner with the power to wash sins and guilt from a person's conscience in the 1985 Tales from the Darkside episode "It All Comes Out in the Wash". Hong appeared as a villain in a season three episode of The X-Files. He appeared in two episodes of The West Wing (Ep. 1.11; 3.15) as the Chinese Ambassador to the United States. He also played Mr. Soo on The King of Queens, an Asian restaurant owner again who rents Doug Heffernan and his friends a loft apartment above his store, in the episode "Apartment Complex" (2006). Additionally, Hong had guest-starred on Friends, playing Hoshi, the former paid assassin and boxing coach for Monica's boyfriend Pete (played by Jon Favreau) in the episode "The One with the Ultimate Fighting Champion".

Hong played Jeff Wong, Cassandra Wong's martial arts expert father, in the comedy sequel Wayne's World 2, and was featured as the head of the Scarred Foot society in the pilot for The Adventures of Brisco County, Jr. (1993). In 1994, he, his wife Susan and daughter April appeared as a family riding mountain bikes beneath the Hollywood sign in the mountain-bike travel-adventure documentary, Full Cycle: A World Odyssey. He had a small role in the independent film Broken Vessels (1998). He played the role of Mr. Takato in the movie Chasing Zoey, the final episode of Zoey 101. His character taught Michael Barret how to operate a manual transmission, and it was revealed at the end of the episode that he did not exist. Hong also voiced the character Daolon Wong, an evil wizard in the Jackie Chan Adventures television series, and was the voice of Chi-Fu in Disney's Mulan, A.N.T. Farm, Mandarin in Super Robot Monkey Team Hyperforce Go!, and Professor Chang in Teen Titans. He made a cameo appearance on the television series Las Vegas as a presumed cheating monk. Hong also lent his voice to the Cartoon Network animation Chowder as Mung Daal's mentor in the "Won-Ton Bombs" episode. In 2006, Hong voiced the character Mayor Tong in Avatar: The Last Airbender in the second season's episode titled "Avatar Day" in addition to his previous role as Monk Tashi in the first-season episode "The Storm" in 2005. In 2006, he also voiced the character of the High Lama in the film Chill Out, Scooby-Doo!

Hong's voice also appeared as Colonel Zhou Peng in the video game Mercenaries: Playground of Destruction, Dr. Chang in Def Jam Icon (2007), Ancient Wu in True Crime: Streets of LA, and reprising his role as Chew in the Blade Runner video game. His most recent appearances were in the films Balls of Fury and The Day the Earth Stood Still. In 2008, he voiced Mr. Ping in Kung Fu Panda, the adoptive father of Po and was nominated for an Annie Award for his performance; he later reprised the role on Kung Fu Panda Holiday Special and won an Annie Award for Voice Acting in a Television Production. Furthermore, he and Lucy Liu have been collaborated in the feature film series and in the television series adaptation, Kung Fu Panda: Legends of Awesomeness. After the release of the third film he stated that he hoped to continue in the role, though due to his advanced age he wanted the filmmakers to start work on it quickly. He would reprise again for subsequent streaming series Kung Fu Panda: The Paws of Destiny and Kung Fu Panda: The Dragon Knight. In 2015, Hong voiced Azmorigan on Star Wars Rebels as well as the Sugi arms dealer Endente in an unfinished four-part story arc of Star Wars: The Clone Wars; the rough animatics of which were posted on the Star Wars website.

He appeared in the film Safe (2012). He also provides the voices for the jeweler NPC Covetous Shen in Diablo III, Master Bruised Paw in World of Warcraft: Mists of Pandaria, Bucky (for two episodes) from the television series Archer, and Uncle Po in Sleeping Dogs. In 2013, he appeared as Ogisan, the gift shop keeper from the Incredible Crew sketch "Magical Video Game Controller" alongside Jeremy Shada and Shauna Case. He also appeared in the film R.I.P.D. (2013). In 2014, he voiced the character Ho Chan in the 2012 3D animated cartoon Teenage Mutant Ninja Turtles, a clear parody of his character in Big Trouble in Little China, David Lo Pan.

Hong guest-starred in a 2015 episode of Agents of S.H.I.E.L.D. as the father of Melinda May, played by Ming-Na Wen, with whom he co-starred in Mulan.

In 2018, it was announced that he was producing a feature screenplay about a grandfather and his estranged granddaughter who realize, through an unexpected adventure that pushes them into another world, that family relationships are the key to survival. Later it was revealed that the film's title is Patsy Lee & the Keepers of the 5 Kingdoms, directed by Zack Ward, starring Michelle Fang.

Hong appears in the A24 film Everything Everywhere All at Once, which was released on March 25, 2022. He won the Screen Actors Guild Award for Outstanding Performance by a Cast in a Motion Picture with the film's ensemble. He attended the 2023 Academy Awards ceremony, where the film garnered 7 Oscars from 11 nominations, wearing a bow tie with googly eyes.

Hong is set to voice Grandpa Wing in the streaming television series Gremlins: Secrets of the Mogwai, currently in pre-production.

Personal life

Hong lives in Los Angeles, California, with his wife Susan Tong whom he married in 1977. The couple have three daughters and eight grandchildren.

Hong is a Presbyterian; he attended the Westminster Presbyterian Church with his family as a child in Minneapolis.

A successful campaign to get Hong a star on the Hollywood Walk of Fame was started by fellow actor Daniel Dae Kim on GoFundMe in 2020. He received a star as a member of the 2022 class of honorees. At 93 years of age, Hong became the oldest person to accept the honor.

Filmography

References

Sources

External links

 
 

1929 births
Living people
20th-century American engineers
20th-century American male actors
21st-century American male actors
American Presbyterians
American civil engineers
American male actors of Chinese descent
American male film actors
American film actors of Asian descent
American male television actors
American male video game actors
American male voice actors
American people of Chinese descent
American people of Hong Kong descent
Annie Award winners
Central High School (Minneapolis, Minnesota) alumni
Chinatown, Los Angeles
Los Angeles County Department of Public Works
Male actors from Minneapolis
Outstanding Performance by a Cast in a Motion Picture Screen Actors Guild Award winners
USC Viterbi School of Engineering alumni